Pseudocheles is a genus of crustaceans belonging to the monotypic family Pseudochelidae.

The species of this genus are found in Central and Southern America.

Species:

Pseudocheles chacei 
Pseudocheles enigma 
Pseudocheles falsapinca 
Pseudocheles neutra

References

Decapods